Czech Republic competed at the 1998 Winter Paralympics in Nagano, Japan. 6 competitors from Czech Republic won 7 medals including 3 gold, 3 silver and 1 bronze and finished 13th in the medal table.

See also 
 Czech Republic at the Paralympics
 Czech Republic at the 1998 Winter Olympics

References 

1998
1998 in Czech sport
Nations at the 1998 Winter Paralympics